A constitutional referendum was held in Equatorial Guinea on 13 November 2011. It allowed the incumbent President Teodoro Obiang Nguema Mbasogo (ruling since 1979) to run for at least two more seven-year terms as well as establish the post of Vice-President, widely expected to be given to his son Teodoro Nguema Obiang Mangue in preparation of dynastic succession.

Background
The constitutional changes included imposing term limits on the presidency, allowing two seven-year terms. They also abolished age restrictions, allowing the then 69-year old President Obiang to run when he turned 75. The changes were hailed by the government as a democratic advance, with the addition of term limits highlighted by state media. They would also allow the president to create the post of Vice President, suspected to be given to Obiang's son, Teodoro Obiang Nguema Mbasogo, then under investigation in the United States and France for money laundering.

Conduct
Many denounced the referendum as fake, with many widespread cases of voter fraud and intimidation of groups trying to monitor the votes. They also pointed to the fact that votes were counted by those close to the government. Opposition leader Plácido Micó Abogo claimed that the proposal was not even seen the official text of the constitutional changes. He removed poll watchers after threats of violence, including one of a young supporter who alleged he "was threatened with being tortured by a colonel." Despite these reports, the government claimed the vote had passed peacefully. There was also concern that the provision on term limits would not apply retrospectively, allowing Obiang to run again in 2016, which he did.

Results

References

Equatorial Guinea
Referendums in Equatorial Guinea
Constitutional
Constitutional referendums in Equatorial Guinea